Hold That Lion! is a 1947 short subject directed by Jules White starring American slapstick comedy team The Three Stooges (Moe Howard, Larry Fine and Shemp Howard). It is the 100th entry in the series released by Columbia Pictures starring the comedians, who released 190 shorts for the studio between 1934 and 1959.

Plot
The Stooges are the sole heirs to a grandiose inheritance, but the money is in the hands of an underhanded broker named Icabod Slipp (Kenneth MacDonald). One by one the Stooges confront Slipp in his office. He in turn accuses first Larry, then Moe, then Shemp, of being that crook, and successfully flees his office with the money.

The Stooges follow Slipp on board a train. They start searching for Slipp, but a conductor comes after them for tickets. After tricking the conductor, they escape and hide out in a large crate in the baggage car. A lion is also in the crate, and the Stooges flee, hiding in a sleeping berth. The Stooges decide to catch Slipp in the morning before going to sleep.

The lion walks into a room, where a pullman porter is busy shining a pair of shoes, not noticing the animal until it growls when he picks up its tail. The frightened porter tries to escape, but gets stuck, as the lion leaves the room.

As the Stooges sleep, Moe inadvertently sticks his foot out through the curtain and the lion licks it. Moe (believing Shemp was tickling his foot) tells Shemp to sleep on him and Larry's side of the bed, inadvertently allowing the lion to climb up into the berth. After bickering with each other the Stooges notice the lion and escape, pulling down all the curtains to the berths and waking everyone up.

As they make their getaway among the chaos, the Stooges finally spot Slipp and take off after him. They chase him to the baggage car and manage to defeat him, claiming their inheritance.

Supporting Cast
Kenneth MacDonald as Icabod Slipp
Emil Sitka as Attorney
Dudley Dickerson as Pullman Porter
Heinie Conklin as Train Conductor (uncredited)
Curly Howard as Sleeping Train Passenger (uncredited)
Tanner as Lion (uncredited)
 Victor Travers as Bearded Man (uncredited)
Blackie Whiteford as Train Passenger (uncredited)
 Dorothy Mueller as Train Passenger (uncredited)

Production notes
Hold That Lion! was filmed on January 28–31, 1947, the first film produced after the new year. The film premiered the final version of "Three Blind Mice" as the Stooges' theme music, an updated, faster version arranged by Spud Murphy in the key of F major (the Curly period featured versions in G major, making it easy to differentiate between the two eras). With minor variations (all in F), this version was used through the end of Stooges' short subject releases in 1959. Although Hold That Lion! was the third film released featuring Shemp after his return to the Stooges, it was filmed after Squareheads of the Round Table and The Hot Scots, both which still utilized the "sliding strings" version of "Three Blind Mice" featured in the previous Shemp entries Fright Night and Out West, and in the final 12 entries starring Curly.

The film title is a parody of the football term, "Hold that line!"

Icabod Slipp's name appears on the door as "I. Slipp." This is a semantic parody on the Long Island town of Islip, New York.

This was the final Three Stooges film (excluding Booty and the Beast) to feature Tanner the Lion, who had previously appeared in You Nazty Spy!, Three Missing Links, Wee Wee Monsieur, and Movie Maniacs, as well as his last film appearance in general, before the lion's death in 1952. Whenever Tanner was required to growl or act angry, he was filmed by himself, while when he was onscreen with other people, he was filmed in a tame state. The FAO Schwarz lion plush served as a stand-in for Tanner for when the Stooges see him sitting at the foot of their bed. The film also recycled gags from Tanner's previous appearances (breathing from behind and licking the Stooges' feet).

Shemp Howard (a man of many phobias) was reportedly so frightened of lions that he insisted a glass plate be placed in between him and Tanner while filming the scene in the crate, and the Stooges' reflection in the glass can be seen as they are hastily exiting the crate. Apparently, though, Columbia Pictures hired Tanner who was currently in his elder years. Emil Sitka later commented that the feline was "so sickly, he would fall asleep in the middle of a take."

There is an audio goof in the film during a scene that featured Dudley Dickerson reacting to the lion. The laughing of a crew member can be heard in the background.

When the Stooges enter the berth, Larry's stunt-double can briefly be seen.

Curly Howard returns
Hold That Lion! is notable for a cameo appearance by former Stooge Curly, younger brother of Shemp and Moe. He appears as a snoring passenger who the Stooges think is Icabod Slipp, the man they are looking for. This was the only film that featured not only all four of the original stooges in new footage together but also the three Howard brothers — Moe, Curly, and Shemp — in new footage within the same film. This also marks the first time Curly is shown on camera with a full head of hair, and his only film appearance following the stroke that ended his career as a full-time Stooge.

Director Jules White remembers:
It was a spur of the moment idea. Curly was visiting the set; this was some time after his stroke. Apparently he came in on his own since I didn't see a nurse with him. He was sitting around, reading a newspaper. As I walked in, the newspaper, which he had in front of his face, came down and he waved hello to me. I thought it would be funny to have him do a bit in the picture, and he was happy to do it.

Recycling template
Hold That Lion! would be the template for recycled films starting in 1953. Three films in a row utilized footage from this short:
First, Booty and the Beast recycled the second half of Hold That Lion! consisting of scenes on the train (including Curly Howard's cameo);
Next, Loose Loot recycled the first half, consisting of scenes in various offices;
Finally, Tricky Dicks recycled the only segment from Hold That Lion! not previously used: the filing cabinet sequence from the early office scenes.
Due to this successful practice, director Jules White would begin recycling entire scenes (rather than re-film them) as a cost-saving tactic for the remainder of the Stooges' tenure in Columbia Pictures' short subject department.

References

External links 

 
 
Hold That Lion! at threestooges.net

1947 films
The Three Stooges films
American black-and-white films
Films directed by Jules White
Fiction about rail transport
Rail transport films
Columbia Pictures short films
Films about lions
Films with screenplays by Felix Adler (screenwriter)
1940s English-language films
1940s American films